The National Media Council (NMC) is a federal institution of the United Arab Emirates (U.A.E.) that was established by virtue of Federal Law No. 1 of 2006. It promotes and supports all media-related initiatives and activities in the U.A.E. and abroad. Goals set for the council are “Providing an integrated regulatory environment conductive to the development of the media sector in the U.A.E., highlighting the U.A.E. accomplishments in media both nationally and internationally and ensuring that all administration services are delivered with high quality, efficiency and transparency”.

In July 2020, due to the on-going COVID-19 pandemic crisis, Sheikh Mohammed bin Rashid Al Maktoum announced a mandated restructure of the federal U.A.E. government that would reduce roughly half of its infrastructure, and relegate many services into the digital space. This restructure will take two years to complete. Consequently, the National Media Council would merge with the Federal Youth Authority under the Ministry of Culture & Knowledge Development, which has been renamed as the Ministry of Culture & Youth. In June 2021, the Ministry launched the Media Regulatory Office to execute a number of functions and tasks previously under the National Media Council.

UAE Media Laws and Regulations
The UAE has several laws and resolutions that organize the media field, and the council undertakes a vital role in their implementation. The UAE has six main laws and resolutions: AUE Copyright Law 7 of 2002, Cabinet decision No. 4 of 2006 on the system the National Media Council, Cabinet decision No. 14 of 2006 on the system the National Media Council, Council of Ministers Resolution No. (70/13) for the year 2007 meeting No. 4 to regulate the exercise of some of the free media licenses and President of the Council Decision No. 35 for the year 2012 on the criteria content and advertising media.

NMC Relations
The national Media Council is interested in setting up relations with a number of Media, government and Academic institutions in order to achieve its main strategic goals. Such partners include: National Media Institutions, Regional and International Media Institutions, Media Free Zone, Federal and Local Institutions.

NMC Structure
Besides its headquarters in Abu Dhabi, The UAE National Media Council has subsidiaries in the other Emirates. Former chairman of “Sky News Arabia”, Minister of state Dr. Sultan Ahmed Al Jaber has chaired the NMC since May 2015. The council has a board that supervises several sub-committees undertaking specific missions. The UAE cabinet has approved the new changes introduced to NMC structure by virtue of Resolution No. 9 of 2013 and Resolution No. 12 of 2013 that define this structure in accordance with “UAE Vision 2021”.

Current status
In accordance to the U.A.E.'s Federal Law No. 11 of 2016, the National Media Council is the legitimate federal entity for media regulation. However, in June 2021, the Media Regulatory Office has taken over many tasks formerly assigned to the National Media Council. In September 2021, the National Media Council's official website has been suspended indefinitely. Despite this, as of October 2021 there was no definitive evidence the National Media Council had been completely superseded.

References

External links
  (The NMC website has been suspended indefinitely as of 19 September 2021)
 

2006 establishments in the United Arab Emirates
Censorship in the United Arab Emirates
Film organisations in the United Arab Emirates
Entertainment rating organizations
Government agencies of the United Arab Emirates
Mass media in the United Arab Emirates
Motion picture rating systems
Video game content ratings systems
Video game organizations